The Australia national cricket team toured South Africa from November 1935 to March 1936 and played a five-match Test series against South Africa. Australia won the Test series 4–0. Australia were captained by Vic Richardson; South Africa by Herby Wade.

The team

Vic Richardson (captain)
Stan McCabe (vice-captain)
Ben Barnett
Bill Brown
Arthur Chipperfield
Len Darling
Jack Fingleton
Chuck Fleetwood-Smith
Clarrie Grimmett
Ernie McCormick
Leo O'Brien
Bert Oldfield
Bill O'Reilly
Morris Sievers

Don Bradman and Alan Kippax were unavailable. Hans Ebeling was selected but later withdrew and was replaced by Sievers. Harold Rowe was the manager.

The tour
The Australians played 16 matches, all of them first-class. They won 13 (10 of them by an innings) and drew the other three. Of their four victories in the Tests, three were by an innings.

The leg-spin bowlers Grimmett (44 wickets) and O'Reilly (27) took 71 wickets between them in the Tests; the other Australian bowlers together took 27 wickets. On the tour overall O'Reilly took 95 wickets at an average of 13.56 and Grimmett took 92 at 14.80.

Test series summary

First Test

Second Test

Third Test

Fourth Test
{{Two-innings cricket match
| date = 15, 17 February 1936(4-day match)
| team1 = 
| team2 = 

| score-team1-inns1 = 157 (63.4 overs)
| runs-team1-inns1 = IJ Siedle 44
| wickets-team1-inns1 = WJ O'Reilly 5/20 (21 overs)

| score-team2-inns1 = 439 (127.4 overs)
| runs-team2-inns1 = JHW Fingleton 108
| wickets-team2-inns1 = EQ Davies 4/75 (24.4 overs)

| score-team1-inns2 = 98 (43.5 overs)
| runs-team1-inns2 = B Mitchell 48*
| wickets-team1-inns2 = CV Grimmett 7/40 (19.5 overs)

| score-team2-inns2 = 
| runs-team2-inns2 = 
| wickets-team2-inns2 = 

| result = Australia won by an innings and 184 runs
| report = Scorecard
| venue = Old Wanderers, Johannesburg
| umpires = RGA Ashman and JC Collings
| toss = South Africa won the toss and elected to bat.
| rain = 16 February was taken as a rest day.The match was scheduled for four days but completed in two.| notes = RL Harvey and EQ Davies (both SA) made their Test debuts.
}}

Fifth Test

References

External links
 Australia in South Africa, 1935-36 at Cricinfo
 Australia in South Africa 1935-36 at CricketArchive
 Test Cricket Tours – Australia to South Africa 1935-36 at Test Cricket Tours

Further reading
 Brian Bassano, Vic's Boys: Australia in South Africa 1935-36 Louis Duffus, "The Australians in South Africa", The Cricketer Spring Annual, 1936, pp. 70-77
 Jack Fingleton, Cricket Crisis, pp. 214-32
 Arthur Mailey, Cricket Sketches: South African Tour 1935-36 Wisden Cricketers' Almanack'' 1937

1935 in Australian cricket
1935 in South African cricket
1936 in Australian cricket
1936 in South African cricket
International cricket competitions from 1918–19 to 1945
1935
South African cricket seasons from 1918–19 to 1944–45